Strathbogie (Scottish Gaelic: Srath Bholgaidh or Srath Bhalgaidh) is a district and river valley of northwest Aberdeenshire in Scotland, formerly one of the great divisions of that shire, called lordships or thanages, comprehending the whole original estate that King Robert the Bruce gave to the noble family of Gordon, the ancestors of the Duke of Gordon. By 1836, the lordship had become extinct.

Name
Strathbogie is first documented as "Strathbolgyn", a name which incorporates the elements strath meaning "broad valley"; bolg, meaning "bag" or "belly"; and -aidh, a suffix indicating an adjective. The name therefore means  "bag-shaped valley".

History
The placename Strathbogie is first attested in a version of the Pictish King Lists dated to c. 1124, describing the death of Lulach, son of Macbeth and King of Alba, at Essie in Strathbogie in 1058. Strathbogie was probably granted in the 12th century as a provincial lordship by David I to David of Strathbogie, a younger son of the Earl of Fife, but it is first documented as a defined territory in 1226. The lands listed in this document exactly match those listed as belonging to the lordship in 1600, showing that the lordship had always consisted of the nine parishes of Kinnoir, Essie, Rhynie, Dunbennan, Ruthven, Glass, Drumdelgie, Botary, and Gartly.
In 1839, the General Assembly suspended seven ministers from Strathbogie for proceeding with an induction in Marnoch in defiance of its orders. In 1841, the seven Strathbogie ministers were deposed for acknowledging the superiority of the secular court in spiritual matters. These events culminated in the Disruption of 1843.

Geography

References

Bibliography
 
 

Districts of Scotland
Provincial lordships of Scotland